Wagaman is the name of several languages in Australia. It may be:
Wagiman language (language isolate)
Wakaman language (Gugu Wagaman, a variety of Guugu Yalandji)
Agwamin language (Wamin)